Wild & Mild is the fourth studio album by Japanese band Tokio. It was released on March 26, 1997. The album reached ninth place on the Oricon weekly chart and charted for four weeks.

Track listing

References 

1997 albums
Tokio (band) albums